Adam Levin Søbøtker (3 August 1753 – 2 February 1823) was a Danish planter, landowner, colonial official and military officer in the Danish West Indies. He was for a while the largest landowner on the islands and was the father of Johannes Søbøtker. Søbøtker was third generation of a family of planters in the Danish West Indies. He was the son of Johannes Søbøtker (born 1724) and Else Nielsdatter. He owned the slave plantations of Constitution Hill and Høgensborg on Saint Croix. He married Susanne van Beverhoudt; the couple had one child, Johannes, who was sent to Copenhagen but returned to the islands in 1721 where he became governor of St. Thomas and St. John.

References

External links
 Adam Levin Søbøtker

1753 births
1823 deaths
18th-century Danish businesspeople
19th-century Danish businesspeople
Danish planters
Danish slave owners
Danish sugar plantation owners
People from the Danish West Indies